M. communis may refer to:
 Macrozamia communis, the burrawang, a cycad species found on the east coast of New South Wales, Australia
 Melocactus communis, the Turk's cap cactus, a plant species in the genus Melocactus
 Myrtus communis, the common myrtle or true myrtle, a widespread plant species in the Mediterranean region

Synonyms
 Merulius communis, a synonym for Schizophyllum commune, the world's most widely distributed mushroom

See also
 Communis (disambiguation)